Walter Tudway Phipps (8 August 1845 – 28 April 1902) was an English first-class cricketer and merchant.

The son of Arthur Constantine Phipps, he was born in August 1845 at Shepton Mallet. He was educated at Harrow School, before going up to Christ Church, Oxford. Phipps made two appearances in first-class cricket for Southgate in 1868 and 1869, with both matches coming against Oxford University in 1864 at Oxford. He scored 44 runs in his two matches, with a high score of 30. Despite studying law and being a student of Lincoln's Inn in 1868, Phipps never became a practising barrister. Instead, he became a merchant in China, where he died at Shanghai in April 1902.

References

External links

1845 births
1902 deaths
People from Shepton Mallet
People educated at Harrow School
Alumni of Christ Church, Oxford
English cricketers
Southgate cricketers
Members of Lincoln's Inn
English merchants
19th-century English businesspeople
Twin sportspeople